Abby, originally named Amy, is a fictional character played by Ciara Janson in a series of audio plays produced by Big Finish Productions based on the long-running British science fiction television series Doctor Who. A human "tracer", a device designed to track down the segments of the Key to Time, she is a companion of the Fifth Doctor.

After her travels with the Doctor, Abby, alongside her sister Zara, would return in their own audio series, Graceless.

Character history
The character first appears in The Judgement of Isskar (2009), in which the Fifth Doctor is brought to a rainy planet where he finds a compass which leads him to Amy, then just a few minutes old and not yet having a name. Telling him that the compass was a segment of the Key to Time, she asks if he could help her collect two more segments. She turns the segment into its original form and puts it into a satchel leading to another universe.

Arriving on Mars in the distant past, and after the Doctor decides to name the tracer "Amy" (thinking she had agreed upon the name), Amy realises that the segment of the Key is disguised as a capstone on the pyramid in the town. The Doctor and Amy are arrested and taken to Magistrate Isskar, accused of being thieves by Isskar's beadles. They are let go with a warning not to approach the pyramid. Understanding but disobeying the warning, inside the pyramid, the Doctor and Amy meet another tracer, a "sister" of Amy, who already had one of the segments of the Key in her possession, along with her assistant in her quest, Harmonious 14 Zink. After agreeing to the Doctor's suggestion of naming her "Zara" ("just to shut you up"), Zara turns the segment back into a crystal, which causes massive and disastrous changes to Mars's environment. Zara leaves with the segment using Zink's time ring. The Doctor, Amy and Zink jump on board an approaching ship, and the Doctor pilots it to safety. Unable to help the catastrophe inflicted on Mars, the Doctor and Amy leave in the TARDIS for their next destination.

The Doctor and Amy arrive inside a castle on the ring world of Safeplace about 16,000 years later. At a castle there, there is a succession dispute between the Valdigians, Lady Mesca and Wembik. Amy works out a compromise between Mesca and Wembik — they agree to be married to one another, so that whoever's son becomes king would also be the son of the other one. When Isskar and his men, now Ice Warriors, are guided to Safeplace by Zara to find the next segment, the Doctor asks Isskar to speak to him; his men bring Amy outside the castle grounds.

Zara spends generations manipulating the Valdigians as well as the Ice Warriors. She realises the castle is the next segment and turns the segment into a crystal, trapping the Doctor, the TARDIS, the Valdigians and Isskar inside. She tries using the power of the segments to take Amy's segment from her satchel. Instead, Zara blows up her satchel, and the Safeplace segment ends up in Amy's possession. While Zara leaves with the time ring, Amy turns the segment back into a castle to allow the Doctor, the Ice Warriors and the Valdigians (with the Ice Warriors towing the TARDIS) to escape. Amy then turns it back into a crystal and places it into her satchel.

The Ice Warriors take the Doctor and Amy onto Isskar's ship to take them to tribunal, and Isskar confiscates the two segments they have, but he later helps the Doctor and Amy retrieve their segments after his ship is destroyed by Zara, and is on a collision course with the red giant Leboon. When the last escape pod is taken, leaving the Doctor and Amy behind, the Doctor tries fixing the ship, before the Black Guardian intervenes, telling the Doctor that he hoped the Doctor could explain the situation.

After finding another segment in Sudan in the 9th century, the final segment is found on the planet Chaos, where he meets Romana and Princess Astra (from The Armageddon Factor). The Doctor discovers that after the key was scattered the last time, Romana had become the final segment of it. To save Romana's life, Astra offers to become the final segment instead, even should it involve her dying to do so. When the Black and White Guardians arrive to try to take the Key away from the Doctor, the Doctor throws it into the Chaos Pool, where it is destroyed, preventing the degradation that it was causing to the universe. With the Guardians leaving empty-handed, Romana invites Amy to live in Gallifrey to join the Academy and become a Time Lord.

Other appearances
Amy and her sister Zara would later return in their own audio series, Graceless. In the Graceless series, Amy's name was changed to Abby, with the in-universe reason being given in the first story, The Sphere: Amy took the name of a woman registered in the titular space station. The out-of-universe reason for this development has not been revealed; however, some reviewers assumed that it was likely that the change was made to avoid confusion with the television companion Amy Pond.

List of appearances

Audio dramas

with the Fifth Doctor
The Judgement of Isskar
The Destroyer of Delights
The Chaos Pool

in Graceless
The Sphere
The Fog
The End
The Line
The Flood
The Dark
The Edge
The Battle
Consequences

References

External links

Fictional characters introduced in 2009
Doctor Who audio characters
Doctor Who spin-off companions
Female characters in literature